Sundar C Babu composes music for Tamil, Malayalam and Telugu films in India. He is the son of an eminent Veena Vidhwan Dr.Chitti Babu and Sudakshina Devi and his brothers are Rangasai and Radhakrishnan. Under his father's guidance, Babu began his film composing in the year 2006 for the Malayalam film Chacko Randaaman. However, he shot to fame with his Tamil debut in Chithiram Pesuthadi in the same year. The song "Vaala Meenukkum" became hugely popular among the masses and since then he has been composing for various films. His popularity in Telugu films began through the film Shambo Shiva Shambo. He studied in an Alpha school.

Discography

References

Tamil playback singers
Living people
Tamil musicians
Tamil film score composers
Indian male playback singers
Indian male composers
Musicians from Chennai
Tamil Nadu State Film Awards winners
Male film score composers
Year of birth missing (living people)